Lieutenant-Colonel Aubrey John "A.J." O'Brien  (5 December 1870 – 31 August 1930) was an officer in the British Indian Army and a writer on India.

Education
O'Brien's father was Edward O'Brien of the Bengal Civil Service. Aubrey O'Brien was educated at Dover College and at the Sandhurst.

Military career
He served three and a half years in the Loyal North Lancashire Regiment, and one and a half years in the 110th Maratha Light Infantry before spending 29 years in the Punjab Commission.

Judicial career
He also remained the district judge as a Lieutenant at Bannu (then part of British India, now in Pakistan). On 9 November 1901 he was promoted to the rank of captain and appointed as the 1st Deputy Commissioner of the newly formed Mianwali District (then part of British India, now in Pakistan). He served Mianwali not once but three times, the second time in 1906 and the third time in 1914. However he was promoted to the rank of major during his third tenure at Mianwali.

Awards and honours
O'Brien was made CIE in 1906 and CBE in 1919.

Death

Selected works
Female infanticide in the Punjab, Folklore 19:3 (1908), pp. 261–75
Mianwali Folklore Notes, Folklore 22:1 (1911), pp. 73–77
The Mohammedan Saints of the Western Punjab, The Journal of the Royal Anthropological Institute of Great Britain and Ireland 41 (1911), pp. 509–520 (with Reginald Bolster) 
Cupid and Cartridges (Sketches of Sport in the Punjab), 1911 (with Reginald Bolster) 
Bahawalpur: Transformation of an Indian State, The Times, 4 November 1926

References

1870 births
1930 deaths
British Indian Army officers
British non-fiction writers
Burials at Brompton Cemetery
Commanders of the Order of the British Empire
Companions of the Order of the Indian Empire
Loyal Regiment officers
Mianwali District
People from Kensington
British male writers
Male non-fiction writers